Cássia Eller is an album by Brazilian singer Cássia Eller, released in 1994.

History
Cássia Eller was recorded in the personal studio of Guto Graça Mello, without the knowledge of PolyGram. This happened because the two previous Cássia albums (Cássia Eller and O Marginal) failed to reach commercial success, and Cássia was decided to resign of the label. The album received a big influence from Marisa Monte's album Verde, anil, amarelo, cor de rosa e carvão, that Cássia heard as nursed her son, Chicão.

In accord of the singer herself, Cássia Eller was her first job with a preproduction work. Initially, the claim was that the new disc had only rewrites, but some unpublished musics finished part of this (as "Malandragem" and "ECT"). Highlights the initial range, "Partners", that had some differences with respect to the original recording, made by the group RPM in the 80's.

It was the first Cássia Eller album to sell more than one hundred thousand copies, in addition to being the last to be released in the LP format. Nowadays, this LP copies are few, because the dissemination of this disc was very small in vinyl disc.

Tracks

Guest Appearances 
 Wander Taffo on "Lanterna dos Afogados".
“ Partners”

References 

1994 albums
Cássia Eller albums